Dominic Brindle (born 30 June 1976) is a British former gymnast. He competed at the 1996 Summer Olympics.

References

External links
 

1976 births
Living people
British male artistic gymnasts
Olympic gymnasts of Great Britain
Gymnasts at the 1996 Summer Olympics
Sportspeople from Bradford
Penn State Nittany Lions men's gymnasts